Lamarckdromia excavata is a species of crab within the family Dromiidae. The species is endemic to the Indo-Pacific near Australia, being found at depths of 30 to 180 meters in benthic environments.

References 

Crustaceans described in 1858
Crustaceans of Australia
Dromiacea